Malcolm Llewellyn McColm (25 June 1914 – 2 May 1966) was an Australian politician. Born in Cardiff, Wales, he migrated to Australia as a child and was educated at The Scots College, Warwick, Queensland. He was a bushworker before serving in the military 1936–46, after which he was a public servant.

In 1949, he was elected to the Australian House of Representatives as the Liberal member for the new seat of Bowman. He held the seat until his defeat in 1961, after which he became a transport and insurance executive.

In January 1966, McColm moved to Rabaul, New Guinea, to become general manager of Rabaul Investments. His company managed a book store, shoe store, and a small plantation. He married Nell Carroll in April 1966, but died in Rabaul on 2 May three weeks after his marriage, aged 51. He was buried in Balmoral Cemetery, Brisbane.

References

Liberal Party of Australia members of the Parliament of Australia
Members of the Australian House of Representatives for Bowman
Members of the Australian House of Representatives
1914 births
1966 deaths
Welsh emigrants to Australia
Burials in Balmoral Cemetery, Brisbane
20th-century Australian politicians
Australian expatriates in Papua New Guinea